The 1910 Rose Polytechnic Irish football team represented the Rose Polytechnic Institute during the 1910 college football season.

Schedule

References

Rose Polytechnic
Rose–Hulman Fightin' Engineers football seasons
Rose Polytechnic football team